Belchamp Hall is a Queen Anne style country house in Belchamp Walter, near Braintree, Essex, England. It is a privately owned Grade II* listed building.

It is constructed of red brick in two storeys in a double-pile plan form with a gabled peg-tile roof with attics. The front facade has nine bays with a parapet. The central bay projects and is surmounted by a pediment. The house was built c.1720 in place of an original Elizabethan house and offers good views across the valley of the Belchamp Brook to the village of Bulmer.

The interior panelling is Elizabethan or Jacobean, probably from the original building. Numerous family portraits by well-known artists decorate the walls.

The surrounding parkland, significantly reduced in size since 1741, is itself Grade II listed.

History
The estate and original house was bought from Sir John Wentworth by John Raymond in 1611. Members of the Raymond family have lived in either the previous or the present hall since then. Oliver Raymond, the son of John Raymond, lived in the previous hall in the 1600s and was Member of Parliament for Essex in the First Protectorate Parliament in 1654 and re-elected in 1656 for the Second Protectorate Parliament. Samuel J. St. Clere Raymond died at the present hall in 1900 after inheriting it 6 years previously. He was succeeded by Samuel Philip St. Clere Raymond and he by Michael Murray John Raymond, M.C.

The hall was used as the setting in the 1990s for the fictional "Felsham Hall" in the TV series "Lovejoy". It is now available as a wedding venue.

References

External links
 Official website

Country houses in Essex
Grade II* listed buildings in Essex
Braintree District